Yehor Mykhaylovych Tverdokhlib (born 17 December 2000) is a Ukrainian professional footballer who plays as an attacking midfielder for Ukrainian club Hirnyk-Sport Horishni Plavni.

References

External links
 

2000 births
Living people
Ukrainian footballers
Association football midfielders
FC Hirnyk-Sport Horishni Plavni players
Ukrainian First League players
Sportspeople from Kyiv Oblast